Shefa may refer to:

 Shefa (Jewish theology) (שפע "Flow" in Hebrew), divine influence in Medieval Jewish philosophy
 Al-Shefa, one of the most famous books of Avicenna
 Shefa Province, Vanuatu
 SHEFA-2, a submarine communications cable linking the United Kingdom and the Faroe Islands
 Doron Shefa (born 1961), Israeli basketball player
 Shefa School, a Jewish day school in New York City